Rumpel is a card game.

Rumpel may also refer to:
Rümpel, a municipality in Schleswig-Holstein, Germany

People with the surname
George Rumpel (manufacturer) (1850–1916), Canadian politician
George Rumpel (1901–1983), Canadian wrestler
Theodor Rumpel (surgeon) (1862–1923), German surgeon
Theodor Rumpel (aviator) (1897–?), German flying ace

See also
Rumpelstiltskin (disambiguation)